Tony Darrow (born Anthony Borgese; October 1, 1938) is an Italian-American actor.

Biography
Darrow was born in the East New York section of Brooklyn. He had plenty of opportunity to observe would-be mobsters and their attitudes while growing up in his neighborhood in Brooklyn. As a teenager, he gravitated towards show business, entering and winning talent shows while working odd jobs.

After ten years of singing in nightclubs, Darrow received an offer to appear in what turned out to be a cult film, Street Trash in which he played a mobster. Several months after Street Trash, Darrow was contacted by the film director Martin Scorsese. It turned out that Scorsese had seen Street Trash and wanted him to audition for a role in Goodfellas. He was successful and was cast as the owner of the Bamboo Lounge, Sonny. Darrow was also in the Woody Allen films Bullets over Broadway, Mighty Aphrodite, Deconstructing Harry, Small Time Crooks and Sweet and Lowdown.

In 1999, Darrow played a large role in Analyze This with Robert De Niro and Billy Crystal. Later the same year, he appeared in Mickey Blue Eyes with Hugh Grant, and got another big role as mobster Larry Barese in the HBO hit series The Sopranos, which he was on for the entire series run (1999–2007). More recently, Darrow starred in the independent film Lynch Mob.

In June 2009, Darrow was charged with extortion in a 2004 incident. Along with Gambino crime family soldier Joseph "Joey Boy" Orlando and associate Giovanni "Johnny" Monteleone, Darrow was accused of ordering the maiming of a man in Monticello, New York who owed money to a loan shark. Darrow and Orlando both pleaded guilty in federal court to these charges in February 2011, in exchange for a sentence of up to 33 months. However, Monteleone cooperated with the FBI. At sentencing, Darrow's attorney successfully argued that Darrow's 50+ year history of community service, medical condition, and lack of prior criminal history warranted a sentence of house arrest, followed by a period of probation. Orlando was sentenced to 51 months in prison and Darrow received six months of house arrest.

Partial filmography
Street Trash (1987) - Nick Duran
Goodfellas (1990) - Sonny Bunz
The Good Policeman (1991)
Men Lie (1994) - Hot Dog Customer
Bullets Over Broadway (1994) - Aldo
Who Do I Gotta Kill? (1994) - Tony Bando
Mighty Aphrodite (1995) - Boxing Trainer
The North End (1997) - Nunzio
Deconstructing Harry (1997) - Camera Operator
Celebrity (1998) - Moving Man in Loft
Analyze This (1999) - Moony
Mickey Blue Eyes (1999) - Angelo
Sweet and Lowdown (1999) - Ben
Small Time Crooks (2000) - Tommy
Crooked Lines (2003) - Jimmy Pico
Searching for Bobby D (2005) - Ralph Argano
Lynch Mob (2009) - Boss Giavanni
One Angry Man (2010) - Bobby
Kill the Irishman (2011) - Mikey Mendarolo
The Goat (2013) - Patsy Pirati
Friends and Romans (2014) - Frankie Fusso
The Brawler (2019) - Tommy
Offstage Elements (2019) - Carlo Capozzoli 
Duped (2019) -  Attorney / Carmine (pre-production)
Made in Chinatown (2021) - Al Capella

References

External links

1938 births
Living people
American male film actors
Gambino crime family
Male actors from New York City
People from East New York, Brooklyn